Sordid emperor is the common name of two species of brush-footed butterflies in the subfamily Apaturinae:

 Asterocampa idyja, native to North America
 Chitoria sordida, native to Southeast Asia

Animal common name disambiguation pages